Robert Marchand is film director who has worked in England and Australia, notably on TV miniseries.

He also conducts workshops in character-based improvisation (CBI).

Filmography 
Fields of Fire for Zenith Productions Palm Beach Productions and Nine Network 1987–1989
Come In Spinner for ABC 1990
Sun on the Stubble (1996 miniseries)
Kangaroo Palace (1997)
All Saints (TV series) (1998) 
The Boys from the Bush (co-director with Shirley Barrett) for BBC 2001, 2002
The Potato Factory (miniseries) for ABC 2000
He was also involved in production of Heartbreak High, Chandler & Co and Singapore Sling.

Recognition
Marchand won the 
AACTA Award for Best short film in 1985
AFI award for Best screenplay in a short film (1985)
AFI award for best direction in a non-feature film (1985)
AACTA Award for Best Direction in Television (1990) for Come In Spinner

References

External links 
IMDb:Robert Marchand (I)

Australian film directors
Living people
Date of birth missing (living people)